This list of non-marine molluscs of the Netherlands is a list of all molluscs other than the marine (salt water) species that live in the Netherlands. This list comprises land snails and slugs, freshwater snails and freshwater clams and mussels. There are 197 non-marine mollusc species living in natural habitats in the Netherlands. 

There are 169 gastropod (snail and slug) species (52 freshwater and 117 land species), and 28 freshwater bivalve (clams and mussel) species living in the wild.

As for introduced species, there are 23 introduced gastropod species (2 freshwater and 21 land species plus Candidula unifasciata as possibly non-indigenous one), and 4 bivalve species, living in natural habitats in the Netherlands. A total of 5 freshwater non-indigenous species live in natural habitats.

Summary table of number of species

There are 4 locally extinct species in the Netherlands: the marine gastropod Rissoa membranacea, land gastropod Spermodea lamellata, and freshwater bivalves Unio crassus and Pisidium tenuilineatum.

Systematic list
This list includes only orders, families and species. (Non-indigenous species only occurring greenhouses in the Netherlands are noted separately, below the main list.)

The source for this list is:
CLECOM-PROJECT: Checklist of species-group taxa of continental Mollusca living in the Netherlands (CLECOM Section I) 14-07-2002

Gastropoda
 Neritopsina
 Neritidae
 Theodoxus fluviatilis (Linnaeus, 1758)

Architaenioglossa
 Aciculidae
 Acicula fusca (Montagu, 1803)
 Platyla polita polita (Hartmann, 1840)

 Viviparidae
 Viviparus acerosus (Bourguignat, 1862) - non-indigenous since 2007
 Viviparus contectus (Millet, 1813)
 Viviparus viviparus viviparus (Linnaeus, 1758)

Neotaenioglossa
Thiaridae
 Melanoides tuberculata (O. F. Müller, 1774)

 Pomatiidae
 Pomatias elegans (O. F. Müller, 1774)

 Bithyniidae
 Bithynia leachii (Sheppard, 1823)
 Bithynia tentaculata (Linnaeus, 1758)

 Hydrobiidae
 Potamopyrgus antipodarum (Gray, 1843) - non-indigenous
 Hydrobia ventrosa (Montagu, 1803)
 Peringia ulvae (Pennant, 1777)
 Mercuria anatina (Poiret, 1801)
 Heleobia stagnorum (Gmelin, 1791)
 Bythiospeum husmanni (C. Boettger, 1963)
 Avenionia roberti Boeters, 1967
 Lithoglyphus naticoides (C. Pfeiffer, 1828) - non-indigenous
 Martoniopsis scholtzi (A. Schmidt, 1856)
 Bythinella dunkeri (Frauenfeld, 1857)

 Assimineidae
 Assiminea grayana Fleming, 1828

 Ectobranchia
 Valvatidae
 Valvata cristata O. F. Müller, 1774
 Valvata macrostoma Mörch, 1864
 Valvata piscinalis piscinalis (O. F. Müller, 1774), Valvata piscinalis antiqua Morris, 1838

 Pulmonata
 Acroloxidae
 Acroloxus lacustris (Linnaeus, 1758)

 Lymnaeidae
 Galba truncatula (O. F. Müller, 1774)
 Stagnicola palustris (O. F. Müller, 1774)
 Stagnicola fuscus (C. Pfeiffer, 1821)
 Stagnicola corvus (Gmelin, 1791)
 Omphiscola glabra (O. F. Müller, 1774)
 Radix auricularia auricularia (Linnaeus, 1758)
 Radix labiata (Rossmässler, 1835)
 Radix balthica (Linnaeus, 1758)
 Myxas glutinosa (O. F. Müller, 1774)
 Lymnaea stagnalis (Linnaeus, 1758)

 Physidae
 Physa fontinalis (Linnaeus, 1758)
 Physella acuta (Draparnaud, 1805) - non-indigenous, synonym Physella heterostropha (Say, 1817)
 Aplexa hypnorum (Linnaeus, 1758)

 Planorbidae
 Planorbarius corneus corneus (Linnaeus, 1758)
 Menetus dilatatus (Gould, 1841) - non-indigenous
 Ferrissia fragilis (Tryon, 1863) - syn. Ferrissia clessiniana (Jickeli, 1882)
 Planorbis planorbis (Linnaeus, 1758)
 Planorbis carinatus O. F. Müller, 1774
 Anisus spirorbis (Linnaeus, 1758)
 Anisus septemgyratus (Rossmässler, 1835) (syn.: Anisus leucostoma (Millet, 1813))
 Anisus vortex (Linnaeus, 1758)
 Anisus vorticulus (Troschel, 1834)
 Bathyomphalus contortus (Linnaeus, 1758)
 Gyraulus albus (O. F. Müller, 1774)
 Gyraulus chinensis (Dunker, 1848) - non-indigenous
 Gyraulus laevis (Alder, 1838)
 Gyraulus riparius (Westerlund, 1865)
 Gyraulus crista (Linnaeus, 1758)
 Hippeutis complanatus (Linnaeus, 1758)
 Segmentina nitida (O. F. Müller, 1774)
 Ancylus fluviatilis O. F. Müller, 1774

 Ellobiidae
 Myosotella myosotis (Draparnaud, 1801)
 Myosotella denticulata (Montagu, 1803)
 Leucophytia bidentata (Montagu, 1808)
 Carychium minimum O. F. Müller, 1774
 Carychium tridentatum (Risso, 1826)

 Succineidae
 Succinea putris (Linnaeus, 1758)
 Succinella oblonga oblonga (Draparnaud, 1801)
 Oxyloma elegans elegans (Risso, 1826)
 Oxyloma sarsii (Esmark, 1886)
 Quickella arenaria (Potiez et Michaud, 1835)

 Cochlicopidae
 Cochlicopa lubrica (O. F. Müller, 1774) - Cochlicopa repentina Hudec, 1960 is a form of Cochlicopa lubrica.
 Cochlicopa lubricella (Rossmässler, 1835)

 Lauriidae
 Lauria cylindracea (Da Costa, 1778)  non-indigenous

 Orculidae
 Sphyradium doliolum (Bruguière, 1792)

 Valloniidae
 Vallonia costata (O. F. Müller, 1774)
 Vallonia pulchella (O. F. Müller, 1774)
 Vallonia excentrica Sterki, 1893
 Acanthinula aculeata (O. F. Müller, 1774)
 Spermodea lamellata Jeffreys, 1830  recently not observed

 Pupillidae
 Pupilla muscorum (Linnaeus, 1758)

 Vertiginidae
 Columella edentula (Draparnaud, 1805)
 Columella aspera Waldén, 1966
 Truncatellina cylindrica (A. Férussac, 1807)
 Vertigo pusilla O. F. Müller, 1774
 Vertigo antivertigo (Draparnaud, 1801)
 Vertigo substriata (Jeffreys, 1833)
 Vertigo pygmaea (Draparnaud, 1801)
 Vertigo moulinsiana (Dupuy, 1849)
 Vertigo angustior Jeffreys, 1830

 Enidae
 Merdigera obscura (O. F. Müller, 1774)

 Clausiliidae
 Cochlodina laminata laminata (Montagu, 1803)
 Macrogastra rolphii (Turton, 1826)
 Macrogastra attenuata  subspecies lineolata (Held, 1836)
 Clausilia rugosa subspecies parvula (A. Férussac, 1807)
 Clausilia bidentata bidentata (Ström, 1765)
 Clausilia dubia dubia Draparnaud, 1805
 Balea perversa (Linnaeus, 1758)
 Balea sarsii Pfeiffer, 1847
 Alinda biplicata biplicata (Montagu, 1803)  non-indigenous

 Ferussaciidae
 Cecilioides acicula (O. F. Müller, 1774)  non-indigenous

 Punctidae
 Punctum pygmaeum (Draparnaud, 1801)

 Paralaoma servilis (Shuttleworth, 1852)  non-indigenous

Helicodiscidae
 Lucilla scintilla (R.T. Lowe, 1852)  non-indigenous

 Discidae
 Discus rotundatus (O. F. Müller, 1774)

 Pristilomatidae
 Vitrea contracta (Westerlund, 1871)
 Vitrea crystallina (O. F. Müller, 1774)

 Euconulidae
 Euconulus fulvus (O. F. Müller, 1774)
 Euconulus trochiformis (Montagu, 1803)
 Euconulus praticola (Reinhardt, 1883)

 Gastrodontidae
 Zonitoides nitidus (O. F. Müller, 1774)
 Zonitoides excavatus (Alder, 1830)

 Oxychilidae
 Oxychilus alliarius (Miller, 1822)
 Oxychilus cellarius (O. F. Müller, 1774)
 Oxychilus draparnaudi draparnaudi (Beck, 1837) non-indigenous
 Oxychilus navarricus helveticus (Blum, 1881)  non-indigenous
 Aegopinella nitidula (Draparnaud, 1805)
 Aegopinella nitens (Michaud, 1831) - non-indigenous
 Aegopinella pura (Alder, 1830)
 Perpolita hammonis (Ström, 1765)

 Milacidae
 Milax gagates (Draparnaud, 1801)
 Milax nigricans (Philippi, 1836) non-indigenous since 1999
 Tandonia rustica (Millet, 1843)
 Tandonia budapestensis (Hazay, 1881)
 Tandonia sowerbyi (A. Férussac, 1823)

 Vitrinidae
 Vitrinobrachium breve (A. Férussac, 1821)
 Eucobresia diaphana (Draparnaud, 1805)
 Vitrina pellucida (O. F. Müller, 1774)
 Phenacolimax major (A. Férussac, 1807)

 Boettgerillidae
 Boettgerilla pallens Simroth, 1912 - non-indigenous

 Limacidae
 Limax maximus Linnaeus, 1758
 Limax cinereoniger Wolf, 1803
 Limacus flavus (Linnaeus, 1758)
 Malacolimax tenellus (O. F. Müller, 1774)
 Lehmannia marginata (O. F. Müller, 1774)
 Lehmannia valentiana (A. Férussac, 1822)

 Agriolimacidae
 Deroceras laeve (O. F. Müller, 1774)
 Deroceras sturanyi (Simroth, 1894)
 Deroceras panormitanum (Lessona et Pollonera, 1882)
 Deroceras agreste (Linnaeus, 1758)
 Deroceras reticulatum (O. F. Müller, 1774)

 Arionidae
 Arion rufus (Linnaeus, 1758)
 Arion lusitanicus Mabille, 1868 - non-indigenous
 Arion fuscus (O.F. Müller, 1774)
 Arion circumscriptus Johnston, 1828
 Arion silvaticus Lohmander, 1937
 Arion hortensis A. Férussac, 1819
 Arion distinctus J. Mabille, 1868
 Arion intermedius (Normand, 1852)

 Bradybaenidae
 Fruticicola fruticum (O. F. Müller, 1774)

 Helicodontidae
 Helicodonta obvoluta subspecies obvoluta (O. F. Müller, 1774)

 Cochlicellidae
 Cochlicella acuta (O. F. Müller, 1774) - non-indigenous
 Cochlicella barbara (Linnaeus, 1758)- non-indigenous

 Hygromiidae
 Monacha cantiana (Montagu, 1803) -  non-indigenous
 Monacha cartusiana (O. F. Müller, 1774  - non-indigenous
 Trochulus hispidus (Linnaeus, 1758)
 Trochulus striolatus abludens (Locard, 1888) - indigenous?
 Helicella itala (Linnaeus, 1758)
 Candidula unifasciata unifasciata (Poiret, 1801) - non-indigenous?
 Candidula intersecta (Poiret, 1801) - non-indigenous
 Candidula gigaxii (L. Pfeiffer, 1850) - non-indigenous
 Hygromia cinctella (Draparnaud, 1801) - non-indigenous
 Cernuella virgata (Da Costa, 1778) - non-indigenous
 Cernuella cisalpina (Rossmässler, 1837) - non-indigenous
 Cernuella aginnica (Locard, 1894) - non-indigenous
 Cernuella neglecta (Draparnaud, 1805) - non-indigenous
 Pseudotrichia rubiginosa (Rossmässler, 1838)
 Monachoides incarnatus (O. F. Müller, 1774)

Helicidae
 Arianta arbustorum arbustorum (Linnaeus, 1758)
 Helicigona lapicida lapicida (Linnaeus, 1758)
 Theba pisana pisana (O. F. Müller, 1774) - non-indigenous
 Cepaea nemoralis nemoralis (Linnaeus, 1758)
 Cepaea hortensis (O. F. Müller, 1774)
 Cornu aspersum aspersum (O.F. Müller, 1774) - non-indigenous
 Helix pomatia Linnaeus, 1758 - non-indigenous

Bivalvia
Unionoida
Unionidae
 Unio pictorum pictorum (Linnaeus, 1758)
 Unio tumidus depressus (Donovan, 1802)
 Unio crassus Philipsson, 1788 - recently not observed
 Anodonta anatina anatina (Linnaeus, 1758)
 Anodonta cygnea cygnea (Linnaeus, 1758)
 Pseudanodonta complanata elongata (Holandre, 1836)

Veneroida
Corbiculidae
 Corbicula fluminea (O. F. Müller, 1774) - non-indigenous

 Sphaeriidae
 Sphaerium corneum (Linnaeus, 1758)
 Sphaerium nucleus (S. Studer, 1820)
 Sphaerium rivicola (Lamarck, 1818)
 Sphaerium solidum (Normand, 1844)
 Musculium lacustre (O. F. Müller, 1774)
 Musculium transversum (Say, 1829) - non-indigenous
 Pisidium amnicum (O. F. Müller, 1774)
 Pisidium casertanum (Poli, 1791)
 Pisidium personatum Malm, 1855
 Pisidium obtusale obtusale (Lamarck, 1818)
 Pisidium henslowanum (Sheppard, 1823)
 Pisidium supinum A. Schmidt, 1851
 Pisidium hibernicum Westerlund, 1894
 Pisidium nitidum Jenyns, 1832
 Pisidium pseudosphaerium Favre, 1927
 Pisidium milium Held, 1836
 Pisidium subtruncatum Malm, 1855
 Pisidium pulchellum (Jenyns, 1832)
 Pisidium tenuilineatum Stelfox, 1918 - recently not observed
 Pisidium moitessierianum Paladilhe, 1866

 Dreissenidae
 Dreissena polymorpha (Pallas, 1771) - non-indigenous
 Mytilopsis leucophaeata (Conrad, 1831)

List of synanthropic species in the Netherlands
These species do not live in the wild or are not recorded in the wild yet, but live in greenhouses and similar biotopes.

List (alphabetically according to their scientific name):

See also
 List of extinct animals of the Netherlands
 List of non-marine molluscs of Belgium
 List of non-marine molluscs of Great Britain
 List of non-marine molluscs of Germany

References

Recommended literature
 (Dutch) , 1991. Schelpen van de Nederlandse kust. Jeugdbondsuitgeverij Stichting Uitgevrij KNNV, 165 pag.
 (Dutch) , 2004. Veldgids Schelpen. KNNV Uitgeverij, 234 pag.
 (Dutch) De Bruyne, R.H., Wallbrink, H. & Gmelig Meyling, A. 2003. Bedreigde en verdwenen land- en zoetwaterweekdieren in Nederland (Mollusca). Basisrapport met voorstel voor de Rode Lijst. European Invertebrate Survey-Nederland, Leiden & Stichting Anemoon, Heemstede. (Red list of Dutch molluscs.)
 (Dutch) , 1994. Nederlandse naamlijst van de weekdieren (Mollusca) van Nederland en België. Feestuitgave ter gelegenheid van het zestigjarig jubileum van de Nederlandse Malacologische Vereniging. Backhuys, Leiden. 149 pp. 
 (Dutch) , 1984. De landslakken van Nederland. KNNV, Hoogwoud, 184 pp. [2e druk]
 (Dutch) , 1998. De Nederlandse zoetwatermollusken. Recente en fossiele weekdieren uit zoet en brak water. Nederlandse Fauna 2. Nationaal Natuurhistorisch Museum Naturalis, KNNV Uitgeverij & EIS-Nederland, Leiden, 288 pp. 
 (German) , 1983. Die Landschnecken Nord- und Mitteleuropas. Hamburg/Berlin, 384 pp.

External links
 Lists of marine molluscs in the Netherlands
  Lijst van zoetwatermollusken in Nederland België en Luxemburg - list of freshwater Mollusca in the Netherlands, Belgium and Luxemburg
  Lijst van landmollusken in Nederland België en Luxemburg - list of land Mollusca in the Netherlands, Belgium and Luxemburg

Netherlands
Lists of biota of the Netherlands
Netherlands
Netherlands
Fauna of the Netherlands